Benbridge is a surname. Notable people with the surname include:

Helen Benbridge (1876–1964), American suffragist
Henry Benbridge (1743–1812), American painter
Hetty Benbridge (died 1776), American painter, wife of Henry

See also
Bainbridge (name)